Kasetsart may refer to:

 Kasetsart University
 Kasetsart F.C.
 Kasetsart University Laboratory School
 2017 Kasetsart F.C. season